Paul Xiao Zejiang (born October 1967) was a Chinese Catholic priest and Bishop of the Roman Catholic Archdiocese of Guiyang since 2014.

Biography
Xiao was born in Guizhou in October 1967. He was ordained a priest in 1994. 

In October 2006, the Holy See announced the decision to appoint Paul Xiao Zejiang as archbishop of the Roman Catholic Archdiocese of Guiyang. The episcopal ordination ceremony was held on September 8, 2007. He received his episcopal ordination with the papal mandate on September 8, 2007. The Chinese government also recognized him as the Bishop of the Diocese of Guizhou, a diocese set up illegally by the Chinese government in 1999, which corresponds to the whole of Guizhou province.

On September 8, 2014, after the death of his predecessor, he became Archbishop Metropolitan of Guiyang.

References

External links
 Krótka biografia na GCatholic.org
 Profil w bazie UCAN

1967 births
Living people
21st-century Roman Catholic archbishops in China
Chinese Roman Catholic archbishops